The Yale Bulldogs women's hockey team will represent Yale University in the 2011–12 NCAA Division I women's ice hockey season. Senior Aleca Hughes will be the team captain. The Bulldogs will compete in the Nutmeg Classic on November 25 and 26.

Offseason
July 26: Incoming freshman goaltender Jaimie Leonoff has been selected to participate in Hockey Canada's National Women's Under-22 training camp. Said camp takes place at the Canadian Hockey Academy from August 6 to 16 in Rockland, Ontario.
August 10: Jackee Snikeris and assistant coach Jessica Koizumi have both earned invitations to the 2011 USA Hockey Women's National Festival. The festival includes 79 players.

Recruiting

Regular season
November 5, 2011: After leading 1-0 in the second period, Princeton extended their lead with three second-period goals. Bulldogs freshman forward Stephanie Mock scored her first career NCAA goal (it was the Bulldogs' only goal), assisted by team captain Aleca Hughes in a 7-1 loss.

Standings

Schedule

Awards and honors
Aleca Hughes, 2012 Sarah Devens Award Winner
Aleca Hughes, 2012 Hockey Humanitarian Award Winner
Aleca Hughes, 2012 Coach Wooden Citizenship Cup Award Winner
New Haven Register 2011 Sportspeople of the Year (Yale women's ice hockey team)

Team awards
Wendy Blanning Award (Most Improved): Danielle Moncion
Most Valuable Player: Genevieve Ladiges
Bingham Cup (Leadership): Aleca Hughes
Mandi Schwartz Award (Spirit): Lynn Kennedy and Genevieve Ladiges
Richard Brodhead ‘68 Award (Academic): Aleca Hughes
Coaches Award: Lynn Kennedy

References

Yale
Yale Bulldogs women's ice hockey seasons
Yale Bulldogs
Yale Bulldogs